East Horndon is a village and former civil parish, now in the parish of West Horndon, in the south of the borough of Brentwood in Essex in the East of England. It is situated just south of the A127 road near Herongate. The village Church of All Saints is located to the north of the A127, and is redundant, but in the care of the Churches Conservation Trust. In 1931 the parish had a population of 440.

History
There were two manors in East Horndon, Heron to the north of the church and Abbotts to the south.  By the fourteenth century the Tyrells of Herongate had been gaining influence, and became the patrons of the church.  This family demolished most of the Norman church, rebuilding it in the present style. The chancel and south transept are late fifteenth century. There is a splendid limestone figure of Alice, wife of Sir John Tyrell, flanked by her children, all named. The south and north chapels were built for the interments of the family. Up the stairs is the south gallery, which was a living room for the chantry priest in pre-Reformation times, with a Tudor fireplace. The tower is squat, with distinctive corner turrets and a stepped parapet.
To the south of the church, East Horndon is reduced to the original old road to Herongate, winding up the hill, two restaurants and two houses. Crossing the road bridge to the other side and returning the way we have come, we find the old road running off towards the Thames, and in its angle is East Horndon Hall, the old manor or Abbots. There is reputed to have been a tunnel from the Hall to the church across the present Southend Road.

East Horndon once had its own petrol station with a nightclub known as "Elliott's", which was renamed Twilights in the mid 1980s. The club was opened during the early 1980s and closed in 1989. At the time of closure, everything was abandoned and left behind, including beer, furniture and equipment. The nightclub and petrol station remained until recently.  The nightclub was a popular urban exploration hotspot but it is unsafe to enter. The site has now been redeveloped into residential properties. 

The southern portion of the traditional parish of East Horndon is now in the unitary authority of Thurrock. On 1 April 1934 the parish was abolished and merged with Brentwood, part also went to Little Burstead.

Legends
Two legends persist about the church. One tells of Sir James Tyrell who went to slay a dragon and died. It appears that he had been asked to kill a serpent-type animal which escaped from a ship in the Thames and roamed the woods round the manor of Herongate and the church, terrifying the people. He managed to slay it, chopping off its head, but he died from his exertions.  His son, looking for him, trod on a bone of the animal and, gangrene setting in, he lost his leg. There is a glass window at Heron depicting a one-legged man. The legend has recently been reworked in comic book form in London Falling.

The second legend is that Queen Anne Boleyn's head or heart is buried there.

Nearest places
West Horndon

External links

Friends of All Saints East Horndon website
http://www.essexchurches.info - All Saints, East Horndon on Essex Churches website
All Saints, East Horndon on Churches Conservation Trust website

References

Villages in Essex
Former civil parishes in Essex
Borough of Brentwood